Jacqueline Tong (born 21 May 1951) is an English actress. She is best known for playing Daisy Peel in the television series Upstairs, Downstairs (1973–1975), for which she was nominated for a Primetime Emmy Award for Outstanding Continuing Performance by a Supporting Actress in a Drama Series in 1977.

Early life
Tong was born in Bristol in 1951, and attended Rose Bruford College. She started her television career in the 1970s, and one of her first roles was in an episode of Thriller.

Career
In 1973, she joined the cast of Upstairs, Downstairs as the new housemaid Daisy Peel (later Barnes). She played this role for 32 episodes until the programme's end in 1975. After Upstairs, Downstairs finished she went back to theatre and played at Coventry rep. She also had roles on television in Hard Times, Spearhead, Thriller (1 episode, 1974), and, alongside Lesley-Anne Down who had appeared with her in Upstairs, Downstairs, in The One and Only Phyllis Dixey. From February to April 1982, Tong made several appearances in Coronation Street as Jackie Moffat, a neighbour of Gail Tilsley. During the 1980s and 1990s, she appeared in Growing Rich, Middlemarch and David Copperfield.

Tong has also appeared in three films, How to Get Ahead in Advertising (1989), Princess Caraboo (1994) and Angel (2007), and has done extensive radio work. Tong's stage credits include The Winter's Tale, What I Did in the Holidays and Albertine in Five Times. However, like most actors, Tong has also suffered from lengthy periods of unemployment.

Recent years
In 2000, she appeared in The Bill and The 10th Kingdom. This was followed in 2001 by The Life and Adventures of Nicholas Nickleby and The Cazalets. Tong played Lynn Walker in the fifth and sixth Trial & Retribution programmes. In 2005, she appeared in Twenty Thousand Streets Under the Sky. She appears as Mrs Todd in the 2016 film of Dad's Army.

References

External links

Jacqueline Tong(Aveleyman)

1951 births
Living people
Alumni of Rose Bruford College
English film actresses
English radio actresses
English stage actresses
English television actresses